Proti may refer to:

Proti Island, an island of Greece, in the Ionian Sea
Proti, the Greek name of Kınalıada island in Turkey, in the Sea of Marmara
Proti, Serres, a city in the Serres regional unit, Greece
Proti, Florina, a village in the Florina regional unit, Greece